The 51st ISSF World Shooting Championships was held in Granada, Spain from September 6 to September 20, 2014.

Senior

Men's individual

Men's team

Women's individual

Women's team

Junior

Rifle 

Air Rifle

Pistol

Air Pistol

Pistol Repeat Fire

Pistol Standard

Running Target

Women

Medal table (senior and junior)
 53 gold medals in individual events + 49 gold medals in team events

External links 
 
 AllSportDB.com Event page

2014
2014 in shooting sports
International sports competitions hosted by Spain
Sport in Granada
2014 in Spanish sport
Shooting competitions in Spain